Jerko Mikulic (Russian: Ерко МИКУЛИЧ; born 26 August 1976 in Croatia) is a Croatian retired footballer who last played for NK Zadar in his home country.

Career
Mikulic started his senior career with NK Zadar. After that, he played for HNK Dinara. In 2002, he signed for Karpaty Lviv in the Ukrainian Premier League, where he made 41 league appearances and scored one goal.

References

External links 
 Erko MIKULIC: "I don't mind performing with Belanovich in Genoa!" 
 Erko MIKULIC: "My departure from the Carpathians is a big mistake" 
 Yerko Mikulich: "Great fans in Lviv"
 Ex-Karpatovets Yerko Mikulich: “Before the game with Bordeaux he was doing Falcao massage. He went on the field and made a hat-trick” 
 "Daniel subordinated everything to his development"

1976 births
Living people
Association football defenders
Croatian footballers
NK Zadar players
FC Karpaty Lviv players
Croatian Football League players
First Football League (Croatia) players
Ukrainian Premier League players
Ukrainian First League players
Croatian expatriate footballers
Expatriate footballers in Ukraine
Croatian expatriate sportspeople in Ukraine